South Carolina Highway 769 (SC 769) is a  state highway in the U.S. state of South Carolina. The highway connects Gadsden and Horrell Hill.

Route description
SC 769 begins at an intersection with SC 48 (Bluff Road) in Gadsden, Richland County. It travels to the north-northeast and curves to the northwest. It crosses over Dry Branch and travels through Congaree. Just past the intersection with Gus Lane, the highway heads to the west-northwest and parallels some railroad tracks and the southern edge of McEntire Joint National Guard Base. Just past its crossing of Cedar Creek, it leaves the base. It turns to the right and heads to the north and crosses over the aforementioned railroad tracks. It then parallels Cedar Creek. It heads to the northwest and enters Horrell Hill, where it meets its northern terminus, an intersection with U.S. Route 76 (US 76) and US 378 (Garners Ferry Road).

Major intersections

See also

References

External links

SC 769 at Virginia Highways' South Carolina Highways Annex

769
Transportation in Richland County, South Carolina